In supersymmetry theories of particle physics, a gaugino is the hypothetical fermionic supersymmetric field quantum (superpartner) of a gauge field, as predicted by gauge theory combined with supersymmetry. All gauginos have spin 1/2, except for gravitino (spin 3/2).

In the minimal supersymmetric extension of the standard model the following gauginos exist:

 The gluino (symbol ) is the superpartner of the gluon, and hence carries color charge.
 The gravitino (symbol ) is the supersymmetric partner of the graviton.
 Three winos (symbol  and W͂3) are the superpartners of the W bosons of the SU(2)L gauge fields.
 The bino is the superpartner of the U(1) gauge field corresponding to weak hypercharge.

Sometimes the term "electroweakinos" is used to refer to winos and binos and on occasion also higgsinos. Note that in other SUSY models the zino is the superpartner of the Z boson.

Mixing

Gauginos mix with higgsinos, the superpartners of the Higgs field's degrees of freedom, to form mass eigenstates called neutralinos, which are electrically neutral, and charginos, which are electrically charged.

In many supersymmetric models, the lightest supersymmetric particle (LSP), often a neutralino such as the photino, is stable. In that case it is a WIMP and a candidate for dark matter.

See also
Gaugino condensation

References

 

Supersymmetric quantum field theory
Hypothetical elementary particles